Paraulopus nigripinnis, the cucumber fish, ‘’‘Montague whiting’’’ is a grinner of the genus Paraulopus. It is a deep water fish found around southern Australia and New Zealand on the continental shelf at depths between 65 and 600 m.  Their length is between 15 and 20 cm. They were first described by Günther in 1878.

References

 
 Tony Ayling & Geoffrey Cox, Collins Guide to the Sea Fishes of New Zealand,  (William Collins Publishers Ltd, Auckland, New Zealand 1982) 

Paraulopidae
Fish described in 1878
Taxa named by Albert Günther